Anselm Franz Freiherr von Ritter zu Groenesteyn (also von Grünstein) (1692–1765) was a Chamberlain of Electoral Mainz, privy counsellor, Majordomo, temporarily Vitztum (vicegerent), High Director of Building and exceptionally gifted architect. His grandfather Stefan von Ritter zu Groenesteyn was of Dutch origin.

Selected works

He took part in many great civil works in the regions under the influence of the Schönborn family. Because of this he planned or constructed at least in part the following buildings:

Deutschhaus Mainz (Commandry of the Teutonic Knights"))
Bassenheimer Hof in Mainz
Draft of Stadioner Hof in Mainz 
Baroque Château Bruchsal, of the new residence of the newly appointed bishop of Speyer
Würzburg Residence
Château Jägersburg, the summer residence of the prince-bishop of Bamberg in Eggolsheim/Forchheim
Church of Banz Abbey/Franconia
Church of Amorbach Abbey/Odenwald
Stone balustrade of Château Biebrich in Wiesbaden-Biebrich
Château Bönnigheim

He tore down the Schwalbacherhof in Kiedrich in the Rheingau, which came into family ownership through the marriage of his grandfather Stefan to the daughter of the house. In 1730 he erected Schloss Groenesteyn, a Baroque three-winged palace including a chapel, on the site. As stucco plasterer he chose Georg Hennicke from Mainz, a disciple of the Frenchman Jean Bérain, who had also worked on the pilgrimage church Zum heiligen Blut in Walldürn. The château is still family property.

References
Gunther Jahn: Der kurmainzische Hofkavalierarchitekt Anselm Franz Reichsfreiherr von Ritter zu Groenesteyn, Diss. 1977

1692 births
1765 deaths
German Baroque architects
People from the Rheingau